Nzalat Laadam is a small town and rural commune in Rehamna Province of the Marrakesh-Safi region of Morocco. At the time of the 2004 census, the commune had a total population of 14,651 people living in 1902 households.

References

Populated places in Rehamna Province
Rural communes of Marrakesh-Safi